Pieter Mijer (3 June 1812 – 6 February 1881) was the Governor-General of the Dutch East Indies in 1866–1872.

References

External links 
 

1812 births
1881 deaths
Governors-General of the Dutch East Indies
Members of the House of Representatives (Netherlands)
Ministers of Colonial Affairs of the Netherlands
People from Batavia, Dutch East Indies